Duboscia macrocarpa occurs from Nigeria to  the Democratic Republic of Congo. It is a tree which grows to 30 m, and often has a fluted trunk. The leaves and young stems are covered in dense hairs. The flowers are pink-reddish brown, with bracts below. The fruits are ribbed and very fibrous.

The species was first described by Henri Théophile Bocquillon in 1866.

References

Grewioideae